Indio 2 : The Revolt is a 1991 Italian action film starring Marvelous Marvin Hagler and directed by Antonio Margheriti and it is the sequel to the 1989 film Indio.

Plot Outline
Former Marine sergeant organizes the revolt of the Amazon Indians against the ruthless mercenaries of a multinational, using defoliants, build a road into the forest.

Cast
Marvelous Marvin Hagler as  Jake
Frank Cuervo  as  Ugadi
Dirk Galuba  as  Vincent van Eyck
Maurizio Fardo  as  Father Leonard
Jacqueline Carol  as   Mama Lou
Charles Napier  as  IMC President
Tetchie Agbayani  as  Mrs. Morrell 
Mark F. Hill  as  American Dancer

See also   
 List of Italian films of 1991

References

External links 
 
 

1990s Italian-language films
1991 films
Films directed by Antonio Margheriti
Italian adventure films
1990s adventure films
Films scored by Pino Donaggio
Italian sequel films
Films set in Brazil
Films about Native Americans
1990s Italian films